Katepally is a village in yadadri district in Telangana, India. It falls under motakondur mandal.

References

Villages in Nalgonda district